Maharlika Nation is an organization based in the Socorro, Surigao del Norte, Philippines. It is a self-proclaimed nation which was noted for releasing its own currency, the G-Zion which is not recognize as legal tender by the Bangko Sentral ng Pilipinas, the central bank of the Philippine government or by any other government.

Background
The Maharlika Nation claims to be an independent nation within the Republic of the Philippines claiming article 37 of the  Indigenous Peoples' Rights Act of 1997 (Republic Act No. 8371) and the United Nations Declaration on the Rights of Indigenous Peoples as basis for its establishment. 

Based in the island of Bucas Grande in Socorro, Surigao del Norte, the Maharlika Nation claims territory in the whole Southeast Asia, and not just the Philippines. Its stated goals is to promote the dignity of the "Maharlika people", the rights of indigenous peoples, and the banning of religion to unite its people under one faith. It designates "New Jersusalem" as its capital.

In early 2020, the Maharlika Nation received public attention when people around differnt parts of the country came to its islands to receive cash gifts in the form of its own currency, the G-Zion. The beneficiaries were allegedly promised that the currency could be exchangeable to gold bars once it was funded. It was also alleged that there was also a membership fee. The Maharlika Nation has denied claims that it is coercing people to pay a membership fee and branded such allegations as slander. The local government of Socorro says it will file a case for fraud against the Maharlika Nation for distribution currency that has no value.

Currency
The Maharlika Nation produces and recognize the G Zion as its currency and legal tender. G-Zion stands for "Golden Zion". As of January 2020, the nation claims the value of one G-Zion is equivalent to 200 Philippine peso. The Bangko Sentral ng Pilipinas, the Philippines' central bank, does not recognize the G-Zion as a legal tender. The currency is produced and distribution by the Maharlika Nation's International Tribal Bank. Its denomination ranges from 1 G-Zion to 100,000 G-Zion.

Status
The Maharlika Nation is a registered entity under the Philippine government's Securities and Exchange Commission.

The Maharlika Nation claims itself to be self-governing under the IPIRA law. However the National Commission on Indigenous Peoples has issued a statement that it does not recognize an ancestral domain by an IP community in the town of Socorro where the Maharlika Nation is based.

See also
Kingdom Filipina Hacienda
Tallano gold

External links

References

History of Surigao del Norte
Organizations based in the Philippines